Mufaddal ibn Sa'd al-Mafarrukhi, commonly known as Mafarrukhi, was an Iranian historian who was the author of the Arabic Kitab Mahasin Isfahan (Book of the Beauties of Isfahan), a local history of his hometown Isfahan. Modern historians generally agree that Maffarrukhi composed his work during the reign of the Seljuk sultan Malik-Shah I.

Little is known about Mafarrukhi's life. He belonged to one of Isfahan's leading families, and was (or insisted to be) descended from the aristocracy of the pre-Islamic Sasanian Empire (224–651). Mafarrukhi's family probably owned land around Isfahan. Mafarrukhi's paternal grandfather was Abu Muslim Tahir ibn Muhammad, a poet in the entourage of the prominent Buyid king Adud al-Dawla. Mafarrukhi's maternal grandfather was Abu Hasan al-Anda'ani, who was connected to the governor of Isfahan.

References

Sources 
 
  
 
  
 

11th-century Iranian historians
Writers from Isfahan
Year of birth unknown
Year of death unknown
Scholars from the Seljuk Empire